Erle Loran (October 2, 1905 – May 13, 1999) was an American painter and art historian. He was a professor of art at the University of California, Berkeley from 1937 to 1981, and the author of a book about French painter Paul Cézanne. His own paintings are held in museums in California and New York.

Life
Loran was born on October 2, 1905 in Minneapolis, Minnesota. He attended the University of Minnesota and graduated from the Minneapolis College of Art and Design in 1926. In 1926, he was awarded the Chaloner Foundation Scholarship to study in Europe for the next four years. He studied the artwork of French painter Paul Cézanne, and he lived in Cézanne's studio in Aix-en-Provence.

Loran returned to Minnesota due to tuberculosis, and he became a painter in his own right. He was painted landscapes and portraits, and he won the Grand Sweepstakes Prize at the 1934 Minnesota State Fair. Loran was also an arts educator. He was a professor of art at the University of California, Berkeley from 1937 to 1981. He authored Cézanne's Composition, a 1943 book in which he compared Cézanne's paintings to what he saw in Provence. Loran was also a collector of Mexican and African art from the Pre-Columbian era.

Loran married Clyta Sisson on May 8, 1937. Clyta died of cancer in March 1982. Loran later married Ruth Schorer, whose first husband was art critic Mark Schorer and daughter was ballet dancer Suki Schorer. Loran died on May 13, 1999 in Berkeley, California, at 93. His work is at the San Francisco Museum of Modern Art, the Oakland Museum of California, and the Metropolitan Museum of Art in New York City. His art collection was acquired by the de Young Museum in 2008. His widow died in 2010.

Selected works

References

1905 births
1999 deaths
University of Minnesota alumni
American expatriates in France
University of California, Berkeley College of Letters and Science faculty
Painters from Minnesota
Painters from California
American male painters
20th-century American painters
American landscape painters
American portrait painters
American art historians
American art collectors
Historians from Minnesota
Historians from California
20th-century American male artists